Clinton "Bär" McKinnon (born December 24, 1969) is an American musician, perhaps best known for being a saxophonist in the San Francisco-based band Mr. Bungle.

Bär, pronounced "bear", is a childhood nickname given to him by his older sisters. In 1989, Bär joined Mr. Bungle and studied music at Humboldt State University, where he met Trevor Dunn and Trey Spruance. His primary instrument is the saxophone, but he plays a number of other instruments, including flute, keyboards, guitar, drums, percussion, bass, and other assorted woodwinds.

He was a member of Mr. Bungle from 1989 to their disbandment in 2000, and has written and performed with Secret Chiefs 3, Dieselhed, and Humboldt County hip hop/reggae/rock fusion band Lakota. He has also appeared on the Melt-Banana album Charlie, on the Carl Hancock Rux album Rux Revue, on the Ray's Vast Basement album On the Banks of the Time, on Eyvind Kang's album The Story of Iceland, and on the Barefoot Hockey Goalie album One Part Thomas Edison. Bär McKinnon performs around Melbourne with his band Umläut and contributes to a  remote supergroup formed in 2020 by the name of High Castle Teleorkestra.

Mr. Bungle

Mr. Bungle's lead singer, Mike Patton, had by the start of the 1990s achieved success in mainstream rock and metal with his other band, Faith No More, which ultimately helped secure Mr. Bungle a record deal with Warner Bros. The group released a self-titled album (produced by John Zorn) in 1991, followed by Disco Volante in 1995. Their third record was California. As a multi-instrumentalist, Bär provided a distinct style, both as a player and songwriter, most notably on California. The album takes inspiration from Burt Bacharach and The Beach Boys, influences close to Bär's heart. The album allowed more freedom for all members of Mr. Bungle in the songwriting process.
California blended lounge, pop, jazz, funk, thrash metal, Hawaiian, Middle Eastern, kecak, and avant-garde music. The band did five tours to support this record. For the most part, perhaps with the exception of the Sno-Core 2000 tour, where they were often booed, the band did have success attracting an audience. The main three members of Mr. Bungle (Patton, Spruance, and Dunn) reunited in 2020 to record a fourth album, which McKinnon did not take part in.

UMLAUT

Umlaut (also stylized as Umläut) is an experimental progressive band based out of Melbourne, Australia. It is the culmination of years of work for McKinnon. Umlaut's eclectic musical stylings reside in the same vein as McKinnon's previous bands, Mr. Bungle and Secret Chiefs 3—injecting an energetic and whimsical blend of pop, jazz, avant-garde metal, symphonic atmosphere, and electronica into its sound.

When Mr. Bungle officially disbanded, Bär was left with material he had written for the band, so he decided to apply it towards a solo venture.  Many of his Umlaut bandmates found him based on his prior music affiliations.  According to McKinnon: "Melbourne is a very hip place as far as music and musicians and there's no shortage of good musos, so I'm super lucky that I ended up here; it just made the most sense. Musos sought me out, perhaps on the back of Bungle's notoriety. I mean, who knew a Mr. Bungle member was living in Melbourne?"

Umlaut has seen many incarnations and lineup changes through the years.

The band has accompanied comedian Neil Hamburger, as well as Secret Chiefs 3, on their various tours in Australia.

Band members
 Bär McKinnon – tenor saxophone, flute, clarinet, keyboards, guitar, lead vocals
 Angus Leslie – guitar, backing vocals, keyboards
 Olaf Scott – keyboards
 Hudson Whitlock – drums, percussion
 Julian Langdon – bass
 Shane Lieber – bass
 Gareth Thompson – drums
 John Myatt – bassoon
 Rob McDonald – vibraphone
 Pieta Hextall – bassoon

Guest performers
 Mike Patton – vocals ("Atlas Face" – 2009)
 Matt Lieber – drums (Umlaut – 2009)
 Jeff Lieber – guitar (Umlaut – 2009)

Albums

Umlaut

Release date: October 10, 2009
Label: Orchard

The album's single "Atlas Face" features Faith No More frontman and fellow Mr. Bungle bandmate Mike Patton on lead vocals.

Review from Consequence of Sound: "Sporadic bursts of circus-themed noise. The sludgy guitar grind of heavy metal. Unpredictable blasts of horn instruments. There's no denying the influence of Mr. Bungle in every note of Umlaut's self-titled album, and how can comparisons not be drawn when the band is the musical venture of Mr. Bungle's saxophonist Clinton "Bär" McKinnon. But though it's easy to see where McKinnon is drawing from, the Australian-based Umlaut is a wholly original project that takes a proven, experimental concept and makes it all its own".

To Your Poverty Quietly Go

Release date: August 29, 2014
Label: Romero Records / Orchard

From MusicTrust: "Unlike the many other bands that seem bent on simply reveling in mad energy generated by constantly shifting and juxtaposing interludes and sections within the one 'song', there is a much higher level of compositional delicacy at play here. It's obvious that Umlaut has thought long and hard about what should and shouldn't go into the cauldron. The creation of multilayered textures on 'To Your Poverty Quietly Go' is something lacking in much of the music that gets made using a similar chop and change sensibility".

Arunachala

Release date: April 19, 2019
Label: Romero Records

From Romero Records: "A very festive new EP from Umlaut, the brainchild of Bär McKinnon (Mr. Bungle, Secret Chiefs 3), 'Arunachala' is equal parts circus jazz, oddball pop and melancholic soundscapes. Sonny Rollins meets Brian Wilson, Pennywise the Clown and the Easter Bunny?"

Kintsugi

Release date: October 31, 2019
Label: Romero Records

From Romero Records: "Just six months after their Easter-themed EP 'Arunachala', more new music from Umlaut... and this time it's Halloween!

Meditative and charmingly addictive forays into experimental pop from the mind of Mr. Bungle saxman Bär McKinnon, with some help from Melbourne legend Angus Leslie (Sex on Toast).

'Kintsugi' is more of a vocal affair than Umlaut's previous releases, think Bungle with a bit of Beach Boys, Beatles and Badalamenti."

High Castle Teleorkestra

High Castle Teleorkestra (HCT) is a remote music ensemble formed during the pandemic of 2020. The group name is a reference to the work of science fiction writer Philip K. Dick. Ensemble members have played in various bands, such as Estradasphere,  Mr. Bungle, Farmer's Market, Umlaut, Probosci, I.S.S., Don Salsa, Secret Chiefs 3, and others, earning the status of "supergroup" for the avant-guard genre.

Discography

Mr. Bungle
 Goddammit I Love America! (demo – 1988)
 OU818 (demo – 1989)
 Mr. Bungle (1991)
 Disco Volante (1995)
 California (1999)

Secret Chiefs 3
 First Grand Constitution and Bylaws (1996, remastered in 2000)
 Hurqalya (Second Grand Constitution and Bylaws) (1998, remastered in 2000)
 Eyes of Flesh, Eyes of Flame (live album – 1999)
 Book M (2001)

Umlaut
 Umlaut (2009)
 To Your Poverty Quietly Go (2014)
 Arunachala (2019)

High Castle Teleorkestra
 "Ich Bin's / The Days of Blue Jeans" (Deluxe single – 2020)
 "Valisystem A / Klawpeels: Mission Checkup" (Deluxe single – 2021)

Guest appearances
 Ray's Vast Basement – On the Banks of the Time (1998)
 Carl Hancock Rux – Rux Revue (1998)
 Melt-Banana – Charlie (1998) (with Mr. Bungle)
 Eyvind Kang – The Story of Iceland [Tzadik] (2000)
 Barefoot Hockey Goalie – One Part Thomas Edison
 Rhymes, Rituals & Rhythms – Lakota (1994)
 The Ribbon Device – Saturation Day (2006)
 Glasfrosch – "If You Go Far Enough into The Sky You'll Come Out Underwater" (2011)
 Twelve Foot Ninja – Silent Machine (2012)

References

External links
 High Castle Teleorkestra official website

Living people
California State Polytechnic University, Humboldt alumni
American male singers
American male saxophonists
American experimental musicians
Singers from California
Mr. Bungle members
1969 births
21st-century American saxophonists
21st-century American male musicians